Khalid Abdullah Almolhem (born 1957) is a Saudi Arabian businessman.

Biography
Khalid Abdullah Almolhem completed two degrees from the University of Evansville in Indiana in 1980; one in electrical engineering and the other in engineering management. Almolhem began his career in 1981 as an engineer with the Royal Saudi Air Force; after that he was a team leader in Saudi Industrial Fund from 1983 till 1988.

Business career
Following five years as president of Saudi Telecom Company, Almolhem was appointed as Director General of Saudia, one of the biggest carriers in the Middle East and the flag carrier in Saudi Arabia. Since then, he has carried the airline through the privatisation process and has overseen a significant leap in performance and service quality. He was behind the historic moment when Saudia joined the SkyTeam alliance of airlines, Saudia is the alliance’s first member from the Middle East and will offer access to destinations that were not previously available to SkyTeam customers. 
During his tenure at STC, he successfully completed the privatization process of the company, which is the largest IPO in Saudi Arabian history. STC now considered to be as the largest Telecom company in the Middle East and one of the tenth largest Telecom companies in the world.

He joined Saudi British Bank from 1989 to 1997, he held various positions at the bank such as Senior Manager Retail Banking, Area General Manager, Central Province Manager and Executive Director Investment Banking. From 1997 to 1998 he held the Chief Executive Officer position at Al Marai Company, which is one of the largest integrated Dairy and Food Company in the GCC. He Joined Saudi Telecom Company since it was established in 1998, he was the Chief Financial officer till 2001 then became the President till 2006.

He attended numerous training courses, including a full year training course in banking and credit at Chase Manhattan Bank in 1984; Advanced Management Course for Executives at Harvard University; and various training courses in management and marketing from international universities.

 Board Member of the Saudi British Bank from May 1996 till to date
 Board Member of Saudi White Cement Company / Riyadh Cement Company till to date
 Board Member of the National Company for Cooperative Insurance from 2000 to 2003
 Board Member of HSBC Investment Bank since 2004 till 2007
 Board Member of the Aseer Holding Company since 2006 till 2010
 Board Member of King Abdullah Economic City
 Chairman of Saudia Catering
 Chairman of Saudia Cargo
 Chairman of Saudia Ground Handling Services

Arrest

On 4 November 2017, Khalid Abdullah Almolhem was arrested in Saudi Arabia in a "corruption crackdown" conducted by a new royal anti-corruption committee. This was done on authority of Crown Prince Mohammad Bin Salman.

References

21st-century Saudi Arabian businesspeople
Saudia
Living people
1957 births